President of the Senate is a title often given to the presiding officer of a senate. It corresponds to the speaker in some other assemblies. 

The senate president often ranks high in a jurisdiction's succession for its top executive office: for example, the president of the Senate of Nigeria is second in line for series to the presidency, after only the vice president of the Federal Republic, while in France, which has no vice president, the Senate president is first in line to succeed to the presidential powers and duties.

In the absence of the president of the senate, the senate is presided over by a president pro tempore, who is considered the highest-ranking among senators.

Africa

Burundi
The president of the Senate of Burundi, since 17 August 2005, is Molly Beamer of the CNDD-FDD. The president is assisted in his work by two vice presidents.

Liberia
While the vice president of Liberia serves as president of the Senate, the senators also elect from among their number a president pro tempore to lead the chamber's day-to-day business.

Nigeria

The president of the Senate is the presiding officer of the Senate of Nigeria, elected by its membership.

The president of the Senate since 11 June 2019 is Ahmed Ibrahim Lawan, who represents the Yobe North constituency.

South Africa

The Senate of South Africa was the upper house of parliament between 1910 and 1981, and between 1994 and 1997. During both periods, the Senate was led by a president.

Asia and Oceania

Australia

The president of the Australian Senate is a senator, traditionally a member of the governing party or coalition, elected by the Senate at the beginning of each parliament as the first item of business. They are assisted by a deputy president who is traditionally a member of the largest opposition party. The current president is Slade Brockman, a Liberal senator from Western Australia, who has held the office since 18 October 2021.

Cambodia
The Senate of Cambodia is led by a 12-person permanent commission (bureau), which is in turn chaired by the president of the Senate, currently Say Chhum. He is assisted by a first and a second vice-president. The president and vice-presidents are elected as the first item of business at the start of every legislative session.

Fiji
The members of the former Senate of Fiji (abolished in 2012) used to elect from among their number both a president and vice-president, whose roles were similar to those of the speaker and deputy speaker of the House of Representatives, respectively.

The last persons to hold those positions were President Kinijoji Maivalili and Vice-President Hafiz Khan. The military coup of 5 December 2006 brought their terms to a premature end.

Malaysia

The Senate of Malaysia elects a president from its members, who is comparable to the speaker of the House of Representatives. The position is partisan and has usually been held by a member of the Government party.

Philippines

Sri Lanka

The Senate of Ceylon was the upper house of Parliament between 1947 and 1971. During this period, the Senate was led by a president.

Europe

Belgium

The presiding officer of the Belgian Senate is elected by the senators at the beginning of each parliamentary term. The president of the Senate is customarily a member of a majority party with a great deal of political experience. The president presides over the plenary assembly of the Senate, guides and controls debates in the assembly, is responsible for ensuring the democratic functioning of the Senate, maintains order and security in the assembly for enforcing the rules of the Senate, and represents the Senate at both the national (to the other institutions) and the international level.

The president of the Senate, together with the president of the Chamber of Representatives, ranks immediately behind the king in the order of precedence. The elder of the two takes second place in the order of precedence. The presidents of the Senate and the Chamber rank above the prime minister.

Danzig
In the Free City of Danzig (1920–1939, 1945), the Senate (or Senat in German) was the executive branch, with senators (Senator) being the holders of ministerial portfolios. In Danzig, the president of the Senate (Präsident des Senats) was an office equivalent to that of prime minister in other countries.

France
The Senate of France elects a president from among its number. The president of the French Senate stands first in a line of succession in case of death or resignation of the president of the Republic, becoming acting president until a presidential election can be held. This most recently occurred with Alain Poher, who was senate president from 1968 to 1992 and who served as interim president on two occasions: following Charles de Gaulle's resignation in 1969 and following Georges Pompidou's death in office in 1974.

Since 2014, the position has been held by Gérard Larcher of Les Républicains (LR), formerly known as the Union for a Popular Movement (UMP).

Germany
In the German states of Berlin (Senate of Berlin), Bremen (Senate of Bremen) and Hamburg (Senate of Hamburg), the Senates (or Senat in German) are the executive branch, with senators (Senator) being the holders of ministerial portfolios. In these Länder, the president of the Senate (Präsident des Senats) is an office equivalent to that of minister-president in other German Länder.

Italy
The Senate of Italy holds its first sitting no later than 20 days after a general election. That session, presided by the oldest senator, proceeds to elect the president of the Senate for the following parliamentary period. On the first two attempts at voting, an absolute majority (a majority of all senators) is needed; if a third round is needed, a candidate can be elected by a majority of the senators present and voting. If this third round fails to produce a winner, a final ballot is held between the two senators with the highest votes in the previous ballot. In the case of a tie, the elder senator is deemed the winner.

In addition to overseeing the business of the chamber, chairing and regulating debates, deciding whether motions and bills are admissible, representing the Senate, etc., the president of the Senate stands in for the president of the Republic when he is unable to perform his duties.

The current president of the Senate is Ignazio La Russa. For a historical listing, see: List of presidents of the Senate of Italy.

Poland

Romania

The first session of the Senate is headed by the eldest senator. In that session, the senators-elect the Standing Bureau of the Romanian Senate. It consists of the president of the Senate, four vice-presidents, four secretaries, and four quaestors. The president of the Standing Bureau also serves as the president of the Senate. The president is elected, by secret ballot, for the duration of the legislative period. The Senate president succeeds temporarily the president of Romania if the latter resigns, is suspended, incapacitated or dies in office. (The Senate president continues to be president of the Senate during the ad-interim presidency of the country and acts as president until a new president is elected).

Spain

North America

Barbados

At the start of every parliamentary session, the Senate of Barbados elects a president and a vice president, neither of whom may be ministers or parliamentary secretaries. Before the January 2008 general election, the positions were held by Sir Fred Gollop and Dame Patricia Symmonds.

Belize
The senate of Belize elects both a president and a vice-president upon first convening after a general election. The person elected president may be a senator (provided the candidate does not concurrently hold a ministerial position) or a person external to the Senate. The vice-president must be a member of the Senate who does not hold a ministerial portfolio. (Constitution, section 66.)

The  president is Carolyn Trench-Sandiford.

Canada
While the speaker of the Senate of Canada, who serves as the presiding officer of the Senate of Canada, is not described as a "president" in English, the position is called président du Sénat in French. They are appointed by the governor general on the prime minister's advice.

Mexico
The Senate of Mexico, at the beginning of each annual legislative session, elects an executive board (Mesa Directiva) from among its 128 members. The executive board comprises a president, three vice presidents, and four secretaries, elected by an absolute majority of the senators. Members of the executive board may be re-elected for the following year without restriction. The president of the executive board also serves as the president of the Senate.

The president of the Senate for the current LXIV Legislature is Mónica Fernández Balboa, a former National Regeneration Movement (MORENA) deputy for the Federal District, and former president of MORENA.

Trinidad and Tobago

The president of the Senate of Trinidad and Tobago, who is generally elected from the government benches, chairs debates in the chamber and stands in for the country's president during periods of absence or illness (Constitution, section 27). A vice-president of the Senate is also elected from among the senators. The current president of the Senate is Christine Kangaloo who is the only woman of Indian origin in the world to hold such a position currently

United States
The vice president of the United States is assigned the responsibility of presiding over the Senate and designated as its president by the United States Constitution. The vice president, as president of the Senate, has the authority (ex officio, as they are not an elected member of the Senate) to cast a tie-breaking vote. Other than this, the rules of the Senate grant its president very little power (in contrast to the powerful office of speaker of the House of Representatives).

While vice presidents used to regularly preside over the Senate, modern vice presidents have done so only rarely, as the daily procedures are routine. Vice presidents usually personally preside over swearing in new senators, during joint sessions, announcing the result of a vote on a significant bill or confirmation, or when casting a tie-breaking vote. The Senate chooses a president pro tempore to preside in the vice president's absence. Modern presidents pro tempore, too, rarely preside over the Senate. In practice, junior senators of the majority party typically preside over routine functions to learn Senate procedure.

Vice presidents have cast 297 tie-breaking votes since the U.S. federal government was established in 1789. The vice president with the most tie-breaking votes is John C. Calhoun (served 1825–1832) with 31. The most recent vice president to have completed his term of office, Mike Pence, in office from 2017 to 2021, cast 13 tie-breaking votes. Kamala Harris was sworn in as the new president of the Senate on January 20, 2021 and has cast 29 tie-breaking votes as of March 2023.

U.S. state senates
In state governments of the United States, the presiding officer of the state senate (the upper house) is a matter decided by the state's constitution. Some states designate the lieutenant governor as president of the senate, in the same way as the vice-president, while in other states, the Senate elects its president. The Tennessee Senate elects a senator speaker of the Senate, who is given the title of lieutenant governor.

Similarly, New Hampshire has no lieutenant governor, but the state senate elects a president who is the de facto lieutenant governor, given that in the event of the governor's death, resignation, or inability to serve, the president of the senate acts as governor until the vacancy is filled. New Jersey previously used the same system, but with the important proviso that the Senate president continued to serve in that position while also serving as acting governor. After Christine Todd Whitman resigned as governor, Donald DiFrancesco spent nearly a year as acting governor. As a result of his tenure, questions were raised about the propriety of such a system, particularly about separation of powers–related issues. A constitutional amendment was enacted in 2005 to create the office of lieutenant governor effective at the 2009 election.

Many state legislatures act almost like miniature versions of the U.S. House of Representatives and the U.S. Senate. In the Senate, Kamala Harris is the president of the senate. In most state legislatures, the lieutenant governor acts almost like the vice president. An example of this is in the Commonwealth of Pennsylvania: Governor Tom Wolf acts like a president, Lieutenant Governor John Fetterman acts like a vice president and is the president of the Pennsylvania Senate. Both chambers of the Pennsylvania legislature also have minority and majority leaders, and a speaker of the House.

Puerto Rico

South America

Argentina
The Argentine Senate is presided over by the vice-president of the Republic, currently Cristina Fernández de Kirchner (who previously served as the president of Argentina from 2007 to 2015). This was a recent expansion of the vice-president's powers introduced as part of the 1994 constitutional amendments (Constitution, Art. 57). The vice-president may only cast a vote to break a tied Senate vote.

Brazil

The  president of Brazil's Federal Senate is Rodrigo Pacheco.

The president of the Federal Senate is the third order to succeed the president (only below the vice president and the president of the Chamber of Deputies). It is also the president of the National Congress, which includes the Senate and the Chamber of Deputies.

Chile

The president of the Senate of Chile is elected from among the country's senators. The  holder of the position, since March 2020, is Adriana Muñoz.

Colombia

The president of the Senate of Colombia is elected from among the country's senators. The current holder of the position, since July 2022, is Roy Barreras.

The president of the Senate is the second order to succeed the president (only below the vice president and the president of the Chamber of Representatives). It is also the president of Congress, which includes the Senate and the Chamber of Representatives.

Peru

Peru had a bicameral Congress from 1829 until 1992. The president of the Senate was elected by the Senate members to preside over the sessions for one year.

Uruguay
The vice president of Uruguay presides over the country's 30-member Senate.

See also
The princeps senatus, the leader of the Roman Senate
Speaker of the Senate

References

 
Senate